Beyond is the sixth full-length studio album of Finnish melodic death metal band Omnium Gatherum and their second record released on Lifeforce Records. The album was released digitally worldwide on February 22, 2013, and physical CD was released in Finland, Germany, Switzerland and Australia on February 22, in the rest of Europe on February 25, and in North America on March 5. the album was produced by Teemu Aalto and Sami Koivisto and recorded at Teemu Aalto Music Productions studio (except for drums, which was recorded at Nordic Audio Labs by Sami Koivisto). It was mixed and mastered by Dan Swanö at Unisound Studio. The album's artwork was created by Olli Lappalainen.

Beyond is one of the most anticipated releases by the band since they made their breakthrough with their previous album New World Shadows. As stated by guitarist Markus Vanhala on the band's official website "The album follows the good known path of New World Shadows and The Redshift but adds a lot of new flavours and spices to the good ol' melting pot to lift the band to a new heights." 
Markus also stated that Beyond is their most melodic and versatile album so far but still holds the brutal side in terms of Jukka Pelkonen's vocals. The basic theme of the album is about the culmination point of one's existence. It is a coming home story where the mysteries of duality are melted into oneness but without losing one single point of individuality along the arrival.

On January 9, 2013, the band released the teaser track "New Dynamic" on YouTube via Facebook page. The official music video for "The Unknowing" was released on February 6, 2013.

Track listing

Personnel
Jukka Pelkonen – vocals
Markus Vanhala – guitar
Joonas "Jope" Koto – guitar
Aapo Koivisto – keyboards
Eerik Purdon – bass
Erkki Silvennoinen – bass (credited, but did not play)
Jarmo Pikka – drums

Production
Produced by Markus Vanhala and Teemu Aalto
Recorded by Dan Swanö, with drums recorded by Sami Koivisto
Mixed and Mastered by Dan Swanö
Artwork by Olli Lappalainen

References

2013 albums
Albums produced by Dan Swanö
Omnium Gatherum albums
Lifeforce Records albums